The 2018 Vitality Blast was the 2018 season of the t20 Blast, a professional Twenty20 cricket league in England and Wales. It was the first season in which the domestic T20 competition, ran by the ECB, has been branded as the Vitality Blast due to a new sponsorship deal. The league consisted of the 18 first-class county teams divided into two divisions of nine teams each with fixtures played between July and September. The final day took place at Edgbaston Cricket Ground in Birmingham on 15 September 2018.

Nottinghamshire Outlaws were the champions going into the tournament having beaten the Birmingham Bears by 22 runs in the 2017 final.

Competition format
The 18 first-class county cricket clubs are taking part in the competition. Teams are initially split into two divisions on a geographical basis (North and South) for the group stage of the competition, each group having nine teams. During the group stage, which ran from July until the middle of August, each county played 14 matches, playing six of the other sides in their group twice, once home and once away, and the other two teams once. The winners of each match received two points for a win, with one point awarded in the case of a tie or if a match was abandoned. Teams are ranked within their groups by total points, then net run rate. At the end of the group stage, the top four teams from each group entered the knockout stage of the competition.

Teams

League stage

North Division

South Division 

The top four teams from each division qualified for the knockout stage.

Knockout stage

Quarter-finals

Semi-finals

Final

Statistics

Most runs

Most wickets

References

2018 in English cricket
t20 Blast